The Ontario Matron Stakes is a Canadian Thoroughbred horse race run annually at Woodbine Racetrack in Toronto, Ontario. Held during the third week of July, it is open to fillies and mares, age three and older.  Once an ungraded stakes, it is now a Grade III and raced over a distance of  miles on Polytrack synthetic dirt, the race currently offers a purse of $115,635 with an addition $50,000 for Ontario bred horses from the Ontario Thoroughbred Improvement Program (T.I.P.).

The Ontario Matron Stakes was first run in 1979. Until 2006 it was known as the Ontario Matron Handicap.

Records
Speed  record: 
 1:42.70 - La Tia (2014)

Most wins:
 2 - La Voyageuse (1979, 1980)
 2 - Spanish Play (1990, 1991)
 2 - Santa Amelia (1997, 1998)
 2 - One For Rose (2004, 2005)

Most wins by an owner:
 3 - Tucci Stables (2004, 2005, 2006)

Most wins by a jockey:
 6 - Todd Kabel (1995, 1996, 1998, 1999, 2001, 2003)

Most wins by a trainer:
 5 - Roger Attfield (1987, 1992, 1994, 2002, 2015)

Winners

See also
 List of Canadian flat horse races

References
 The 2007 Ontario Matron Stakes at Woodbine Entertainment
 The Ontario Matron Stakes at Pedigree Query

Graded stakes races in Canada
Mile category horse races for fillies and mares
Recurring sporting events established in 1979
Woodbine Racetrack
1979 establishments in Ontario